PopMarket is a deal-of-the-day website launched by Relentless Generator in November 2010 that offers 24-hour deep discounts on albums, box sets, and merchandise to its members from major music artists and bands like Santana, Johnny Cash, Miles Davis, and Pearl Jam. The deals are typically themed each week, focusing on a particular genre or era of music such as British Invasion, Folk/Rock Legends, American Jazz & Soul, and many others.

As of 2017, PopMarket has been owned by DirectToU LLC, a subsidiary of Alliance Entertainment.

Business Model
PopMarket offers a new deal each day to its members who subscribe via email. Daily Deals consist of rare and hard to find music products, collectibles and box sets that are hand picked by the PopMarket music team. All deals run for 24 hours and are sold on a first come, first served basis until sold out.

Complete Albums Collections
In 2011, PopMarket introduced the Complete Album Collection a new series of products specifically designed for PopMarket Members. This new product line features complete artist catalogs on CD in a single box from legendary artists including the Byrds, Return to Forever, Sam Cooke, and Stan Getz. With new artist collections added each month.

References

External links
Official Website
Dealzbook Website
Coupons & Discounts

Sales promotion
Deal of the day services
Online retailers of the United States
Marketing companies of the United States
Internet properties established in 2010